Helga Braathen  (5 March 1953 – 11 October 1982) was a Norwegian artistic gymnast. 

She was born in Drammen. She competed at the 1968 Summer Olympics. She died at 29 years old, suffering from anorexia nervosa.

References

External links 
 

1953 births
Sportspeople from Drammen
Norwegian female artistic gymnasts
Olympic gymnasts of Norway
Gymnasts at the 1968 Summer Olympics
1982 deaths
Deaths from anorexia nervosa
Neurological disease deaths in Norway
20th-century Norwegian women